Friedrich Silaban (16 December 1912 – 14 May 1984) was an Indonesian architect. His most well-known designs, such as the Istiqlal Mosque and the Gelora Bung Karno Stadium in Jakarta, were commissioned during the presidency of Sukarno. Silaban preferred architectural modernism over traditional Indonesian styles.

Early life and education

He completed his basic education in Tapanuli, graduating in 1927 before moving to Batavia to attend the Koningin Wilhelmina School, where he studied building design and construction. He graduated from there in 1931.

Career
After graduating, Silaban began working under Dutch architect J.H. Antonisse who had moved to Batavia in 1914, and between 1931 to 1937 Silaban worked on drawings for public works projects in Batavia. He was then reassigned to Pontianak, where in 1938 he designed the Equator Monument. He was interned for several months following the Japanese invasion in 1942, and during this period he met Sukarno, and the two had discussions on architecture and the arts. During his stint overseas, Silaban toured modern architecture including the Eiffel Tower, the buildings of Brasilia, and the Empire State Building.

Aside from his public works projects in Bogor, Silaban began working on national projects in the 1950s. He designed the gateway to the Kalibata Heroes' Cemetery in 1953, and his designs for the headquarters of Bank Indonesia and the Istiqlal Mosque were accepted around 1955. According to Silaban's son, in order to participate in the Istiqlal Mosque's design competition despite being a Protestant man, Silaban had to use a pseudonym in order for his submission to be acceptable. Other mosques designed by Silaban includes the Al-Azhar Great Mosque (the country's largest prior to Istiqlal) and another mosque in Biak which was constructed following the Indonesian takeover of Western New Guinea.

Silaban also took part in the National Monument design competition. While his first submission in 1955 was the highest ranked by the jury, it was not accepted and won second place while the first place went vacant. After a second attempt failed, Sukarno offered Silaban and another architect, Soedarsono, the opportunity to lead the project in 1961, but Silaban refused, preferring to work on the project alone. Soedarsono was eventually commissioned to design the monument.

After the fall of Sukarno, Silaban had less success as an architect, since he was strongly associated with the former president. His career situation was worsened by the poor economic conditions, forcing him to rely on his pension to support his ten children. He did receive some work in the late 1970s and early 1980s, designing a number of private residences and a university building in Medan. Silaban's health worsened in 1983, and he died at the Gatot Soebroto Army Hospital in Jakarta on 14 May 1984.

Style

In his high-profile projects, Silaban preferred clean designs which lacked the ornamentation traditionally found in Indonesian architecture. He wanted to avoid elements which correspond to a specific culture in Indonesia, arguing that an authentically-Indonesian architectural style did not need to imitate traditional forms.

References

Bibliography
 
 
 
 

1912 births
1984 deaths
20th-century Indonesian architects
People from North Sumatra
Indonesian civil servants
Batak people
Indonesian Christians
Indonesian Protestants
Indonesian Lutherans